The Baby-Sitters Club (also known as BSC) is a series of novels written by Ann M. Martin and published by Scholastic between 1986 and 2000, that sold 176 million copies. Martin wrote estimated to be about 60-80 novels in the series, but the subsequent novels were written by ghostwriters, such as Peter Lerangis. The Baby-Sitters Club is about a group of friends living in the fictional, suburban town of Stoneybrook, Connecticut who run a local babysitting service called "The Baby-Sitters Club". The original four members were Kristy Thomas (founder and president), Mary Anne Spier (secretary), Claudia Kishi (vice-president), and Stacey McGill (treasurer), but the number of members varies throughout the series. The novels are told in first-person narrative and deal with issues such as illness, moving, and divorce.

As the series progressed, Dawn Schafer (Alternate Officer), Mallory Pike and Jessi Ramsey (Junior Officers), Logan Bruno (Associate Member), Shannon Kilbourne (second Associate Officer), and Abby Stevenson (replacement Alternate Officer for Dawn) joined the club.

History of the series
The idea for The Baby-Sitters Club series originated with Jean Feiwel, an editor at Scholastic who saw the popularity of a novel called Katie's Babysitting Job and realized there was a market for novels about babysitting. She contacted Ann M. Martin, who took the general idea of a babysitter's club, and created the characters, plots, and settings for the series. It was initially planned as a four-book series, but after the first four novels were moderately successful, Scholastic ordered two more, followed by twelve more as the series grew in popularity. By the time the sixth novel was published, the first printing was up to 100,000 copies. When publishing ceased in 2000, there had been 213 novels published in the series. Of these, Martin estimates she wrote from 60 to 80.

Structure of the novels
With the exception of Super Specials and Super Mysteries, the novels are written and narrated from one character's point of view. The novels generally follow this format:

 Chapter 1: Introduction to character; beginning of plot.
 Chapter 2: Description of club and members.
 Chapter 3-15: Continuation of plot and conclusion, usually accompanied with a subplot.

Main characters

Kristin "Kristy" Amanda Thomas 
 Club Position: President
 Appearance: Shortest girl in 8th grade, white, brown hair, brown eyes; usual clothing is jeans, a sweater or hoodie, and sneakers
 Birthday: August 20
 Age: 12, 13, and 14 in later novels

Kristy is known for her great ideas as well as her bossiness and big mouth that can occasionally get her in trouble. She hates it when she isn't in charge, and the idea for "The Baby-Sitters Club" came to Kristy when her mother was having trouble finding a babysitter for her younger brother, David Michael. She felt sorry for David Michael, as well as her mother. In a flash, as she calls it, Kristy had her "great idea" to form The Baby-Sitters Club. Kristy formed the club with herself, her old friend and neighbor Claudia, her best friend Mary Anne, and the new girl Stacey as founding members. Kristy usually wears jeans and a T-shirt (in the winter, a turtleneck and, if needed, a sweater), sneakers, and sometimes a baseball cap with a collie on it, in memory of the family dog, Louie, who was put down in Kristy and the Snobs. She is athletic and loves sports. She coaches a softball team for small children called Kristy's Krushers, which includes many of the club's sitting charges. Kristy comes from a large family, composed of her mother, Elizabeth, her stepfather, Watson (her biological father walked out of her family when Kristy was six years old), her two older brothers, Charlie and Sam, her younger brother, David Michael, her stepsister, Karen, her stepbrother, Andrew, her grandmother, Nannie, and her sister adopted from Vietnam, Emily Michelle, who is two years old. Her mother and her stepfather got married in the book Kristy's Big Day. The family's pets include Shannon (a puppy), Boo-Boo (a cat), and two goldfish. After Boo-Boo was put down, they get a cat and named it Pumpkin. Pumpkin was named after Kristy's favorite Halloween tradition, and she also looked like a pumpkin.  Kristy is called a "Tomboy" since she isn't that girly and doesn't really care about fashion or new styles like most girls. Kristy's best friend is Mary Anne Spier. Kristy is played by Avriel Hillman in the HBO series, Sophie Grace in the Netflix series, and Schuyler Fisk in the film adaptation.

Claudia Lynn Kishi
 Club Position: Vice President
 Appearance: Asian, long black hair, dark brown eyes, wild and unpredictable outfits
 Birthday: July 11
 Age: 12, and 13 in later novels

Claudia is Japanese American. She is extremely creative in both her artwork and wardrobe. She is the vice president because she has her own phone in her room, and she takes after-hours calls. She always has snacks, junk food, and candy hidden around her room for the meetings. She is described as creative, talented, sophisticated, and trendy. Claudia loves to draw, paint, sculpt, make jewelry, and sketch. She loves to read "Nancy Drew" mystery books. Claudia hides her Nancy Drew mysteries and her candy around her room because her parents do not approve of them. Despite her diet, she maintains a good figure and clear skin. Claudia's mother is the head librarian at Stoneybrook Public Library and her father is a banker. Her older sister Janine is a real-life genius with an IQ of 196. In Claudia and Mean Janine, Mimi had a serious stroke which causes Claudia to take better care of her and be around her more often. Claudia has an aunt Peaches (her real name is Miyoshi), whose husband is named Russ, and a cousin named Lynn. Claudia feels that no one in her family understands her, except for her beloved grandmother, Mimi, who died in Claudia and the Sad Goodbye. Claudia is played by Jeni F. Winslow in the HBO series, Momona Tamada in the Netflix series, and Tricia Joe in the film adaptation.

Mary Anne Spier
 Club Position: Secretary
 Appearance: White, long brown hair worn in childish braids until Mary Anne Saves the Day; she cuts it short in Mary Anne's Makeover, brown eyes
 Birthday: September 22
 Age: 12, and 13 in later novels

Mary Anne is the secretary of the club due to her exceptional organizational skills and neat handwriting. Her hobbies include sewing, knitting, watching classic movies, and reading. She and her best friend, Kristy, initially looked similar (but had very different personalities) until Mary Anne cut her hair and began wearing a little makeup in Mary Anne's Makeover. She also vowed never to get her ears pierced due to being traumatized by almost having her ears pierced by a fellow camper at Camp Mohawk. Mary Anne and Kristy have been best friends since childhood and were neighbors until Kristy's mother married Watson Brewer and Kristy had to move to Watson's new neighborhood. Mary Anne's mother died from cancer when she was a baby, and her father Richard (who is a lawyer) was very overprotective until he married Sharon Schafer and loosened up. She is very sensitive, and shy, is a good listener, and does not like being the center of attention. In Logan Likes Mary Anne! Mary Anne starts going out with Logan Bruno, and she is the first member who has a steady boyfriend. Mary Anne has a stepsister named Dawn, a stepbrother named Jeff, and a kitten named Tigger. In Mary Anne and the Secret in the Attic it is revealed that she lived with her grandparents before her father raised her on his own. Mary Anne is played by Meghan Lahey in the HBO series, Malia Baker in the Netflix series, and Rachael Leigh Cook in the film adaptation. 

It was revealed that Ann M. Martin based the character of Mary Anne on herself.

Anastasia "Stacey" Elizabeth McGill
 Club Position: Treasurer (for most of the books)
 Appearance: White, blonde hair that she often gets permed, blue eyes, trendy clothes
 Birthday: April 3
 Age: 12, 13, and 14 in later novels

A native New Yorker, Stacey moved to Stoneybrook in the seventh grade when she got type 1 diabetes. She quickly became friends with Claudia because of their shared love for both fashion and boys. They are considered to be the best-dressed students in Stoneybrook Middle School (Stacey is the more sophisticated dresser, while Claudia is more creative and original). Stacey has Type 1 diabetes and has been hospitalized several times as a result; in Kristy's Great Idea, she tried to hide this from the others since her classmates in New York teased her because of it, but she eventually told them. Because she excels in math, she is the club's treasurer. Her talent in math inspired her to join the Stoneybrook Middle School Mathlete Club. Stacey leaves Stoneybrook when her father is transferred back to New York City  but returns after her parents' divorce. She later leaves the club for a short time after she starts dating Robert Brewster and chooses him over the club. However, she later returns to the club after she has an unpleasant experience with some girls who pretended to be her friends; this makes her realize who her real friends are. Stacey is played by Jessica Prunell in the HBO series, Shay Rudolph in the Netflix series, and Bre Blair in the film adaptation.

Dawn Read Schafer
 Club Position: Alternate Officer 
 Appearance: White, Long blonde hair, blue eyes
 Birthday: February 5
 Age: 12, 13 in later novels

Dawn grew up in California, until her parents' divorce. Dawn moved with her younger brother Jeff and her mother across the country to Stoneybrook, Connecticut, where her mother, Sharon, grew up. Jeff had a lot of trouble adjusting to the move and soon returned to California to live with their father. Dawn is a vegetarian, addicted to healthy food (she can't stand sugary snacks), likes ghost stories, and is also into environmentalism. She joins Stoneybrook Middle School in the middle of the seventh grade when the club members were having a fight. She met Mary Anne, and they instantly bonded. Her mother and Mary Anne's father married; they dated while they were in high school and once they reunited they discovered that they still loved each other. Dawn and Mary Anne became stepsisters as a result. Kristy, Mary Anne's best friend, is initially jealous, but gets over it and invites Dawn to become the fifth member of the club once the fight between the club members ends. Dawn temporarily moves back to California in Dawn's Big Move, but returns to Stoneybrook in Kristy and Mr. Mom. However, in Farewell, Dawn, she moves back to California permanently. Dawn is played by Melissa Chasse in the HBO series, Xochitl Gomez (season 1) and Kyndra Sanchez (season 2) in the Netflix series, and Larisa Oleynik in the film adaptation.

Mallory Pike
 Club Position: Junior Officer, then Honorary Member 
 Appearance: White, curly red hair, blue eyes, clear braces, and glasses
 Birthday: May 2
 Age: 10, and 11 in later novels

Mallory's first appearance was in Mary Anne Saves the Day as a sitting charge. The members used to babysit Mallory along with her seven younger siblings. However, when she became 11, she joined the club as an Honorary Member after Stacey's departure.

Mallory feels that her parents treat her like a baby, and although she was allowed to get her ears pierced in Mallory and the Trouble with Twins, she still feels self-conscious about her glasses and braces. She loves drawing, writing, and reading; her dream is to become a children's book author and illustrator. Her family has a pet hamster named Frodo; they later adopt Pow, who was the Barretts' dog. Mallory was given the opportunity to teach eighth-grade students as part of a school event. However, after she accidentally broke a piece of chalk, the eighth-grade students began calling her "Spaz Girl" and so did the other students from other grades in the school. This resulted in Mallory transferring to a boarding school, where she stayed until the end of the series. Mallory is played by Meghan Andrews in the HBO series, Vivian Watson in the Netflix series, and Stacey Linn Ramsower in the film adaptation.

Jessica "Jessi" Davis Ramsey
 Club Position: Junior Officer
 Appearance: African American, curly black hair, brown eyes, long legs, flexible
 Birthday: June 30
 Age: 11

Jessi moved to Stoneybrook from Oakley, New Jersey at the beginning of the sixth grade; her family moved into Stacey's old house. She has an eight-year-old sister Rebecca, called "Becca", and a baby brother named John Phillip Ramsey Jr., whose nickname is "Squirt". When Jessi and her family first moved to Stoneybrook, some people were racist toward them because they were Black, but this improved later. In Hello, Mallory, Mallory meets Jessi, and they instantly bond and form their own babysitting club, "Kids Incorporated", before joining The Baby-Sitters Club. In Jessi's Baby-sitter, Jessi's Aunt Cecelia moves into Jessi's house. Jessi calls her "Aunt Dictator" and at first Jessi hates her, but at the end of the novel they become friends, and she is part of the household for the rest of the series. Jessi learns American Sign Language in Jessi's Secret Language when she babysits for Haley and Matt Braddock because Matt is a deaf child. Jessi is a talented ballerina and has leading roles in several ballets, and she takes ballet classes at Stamford Ballet School with Madame Noelle, her ballet teacher. Jessi's best friend is Mallory Pike, as they are both junior officers. Jessi is played by Nicole Leach in the HBO series, Anais Lee in the Netflix series, and Zelda Harris in the film adaptation.

Abigail "Abby" Stevenson
 Club Position: Alternate Officer 
 Appearance: White, long curly brown hair, brown eyes
 Birthday: October 15
 Age: 13

Abby first appeared in Kristy and the Dirty Diapers. Shortly after Dawn moved back to California to live with her father, Abby moved to Stoneybrook from Long Island with her mother and twin sister, Anna. Her father died in a car accident when she was nine years old, which was part of the reason for the move. Abby still misses him and does not like to talk about him. Abby and her family moved into a house on McLelland Road and spent the first night in the neighborhood sleeping over at Kristy's. Abby is Jewish. She has asthma and carries inhalers. She is allergic to shellfish, kitty litter, dust, pollen, milk, tomatoes, and eggs. Abby is described as wild, funny, and athletic. Abby and Kristy have similar competitive personalities and sometimes clash. Anna is quieter than Abby. Anna is a serious violinist who practices four hours a day, and she hates sports. The Baby-Sitters Club invited both Abby and Anna to join the club. Anna declined because of her music studies, but Abby takes Dawn's place as an alternate officer.

Logan Bruno
 Club Position: Associate Member
 Appearance: white, brown hair, blue eyes
 Birthday: January 10
 Age: 13, 14

Logan moved from Louisville, Kentucky, before eighth grade. He first appeared in Logan Likes Mary Anne! He has a southern accent, participates in many sports, and works as a busboy at the Rosebud Café, and the library. He is an associate member of the club, which is a member who is not required to come to meetings, which he takes because he feels uncomfortable with girls, but takes jobs when no regular member is available. Logan lives with his parents, younger sister Kerry, and younger brother Hunter. He is also Mary Anne's boyfriend, although they temporarily split up, but eventually got back together. However, in The Baby-Sitters Club Friends Forever: Mary Anne's Big Breakup, they break up for good. Logan is played by Eric Lawton in the HBO series, Rian McCririck in the Netflix series, and Austin O'Brien in the film adaptation.

Shannon Louisa Kilbourne 
 Club Position: Associate Member 
 Appearance: White, blonde hair, blue eyes
 Birthday: March 17
 Age: 13

Shannon is an overachiever who is involved in many extracurricular activities, and is the only member who doesn't attend Stoneybrook Middle School; she instead goes to Stoneybrook Day School, which is a private school. She first appears in Kristy and the Snobs. She lives in Watson's neighborhood. She has two younger sisters, Tiffany and Maria, and is Kristy's first friend in her new neighborhood, although initially, Kristy thought she was a snob. She is an associate member, which she took because she was too busy to come to meetings. However, when Dawn temporarily left the club, she filled Dawn's place as an alternate officer. Once Dawn returned, she went back to the position of associate member. After the death of Kristy's beloved collie, Louie, Shannon gave Kristy one of Astrid's (a Bernese Mountain Dog) puppies, which David Michael named after Shannon.

Stoneybrook
Stoneybrook is a fictional suburban town in the state of Connecticut. It is the hometown of many of the characters in both The Baby-Sitters Club series and the Baby-Sitters Little Sister series as well.

The town is near Stamford, Connecticut. Several adults in the town commute to Stamford and Jessi Ramsey takes her ballet classes there.

Stoneybrook's known public schools include Stoneybrook Elementary, Stoneybrook Middle School, and Stoneybrook High School; as well as Kelsey Elementary School, Kelsey Middle School, and Kelsey High School. Private schools include Stoneybrook Academy (which Karen Brewer and several other charges attended) and Stoneybrook Day School, which is where associate member Shannon Kilbourne attends.

Karen Brewer's father and Kristy Thomas's stepfather, Watson Brewer, owns a mansion in an upscale subdivision of Stoneybrook. The families of Hannie Papadakis; Amanda and Max Delaney; and Shannon Kilbourne; among others, also live there.

Karen Brewer's mother, Lisa, and stepfather, Seth Engle, reside in a regular middle-class neighborhood, in which the family of Nancy Dawes also resides. The majority of the members of The Baby-Sitters Club also live in a middle-class neighborhood. When Stacey returned in Stoneybrook she moved into the house behind Mallory Pike's so whenever she came outside, her backyard would face Mallory's house. Bradford Court, where Claudia Kishi lives (and at the beginning of the series Mary Anne Spier and Kristy Thomas lived there as well) is within walking distance of almost all of their houses and of Stonybrook Middle School. After Mary Anne's father, Richard, marries Dawn Schafer's mother, Sharon, they move into Sharon and Dawn's house, which is on Burnt Hill Road.

Novels

Super Specials and Readers' Requests
 Super Specials: Super Specials were an extended version of the regular series, with several members of The Baby-Sitters Club (plus at times, their friends and/or sitting charges) narrating (chapter-by-chapter changes of narrators). Super Specials centered on a larger-scale plot, usually with at least three subplots. For example, in The Baby-Sitters Club Super Special #7, Snowbound, some members of The Baby-Sitters Club are babysitting when a snowstorm hits Stoneybrook and the larger area, and the others are spread out. Dawn is stuck at the airport waiting for Jeff with her mother, and Kristy is stuck at home with Bart. The members narrate their experiences and usually, the next chapter would bring on an entirely different plot or an extension of the previous chapter, only with a different narrator.
 Readers' Requests: These were special novels featuring associate members Logan and Shannon, and their personal lives away from the Baby-Sitters Club.

Mysteries and Super Mysteries
 Mysteries: These resemble the style of the regular novels (single narrator), only the plot of the novel mainly focuses on solving a mystery, with a small subplot.
 Super Mysteries: These resembled the style of the Super Specials, with multiple narrators, only the plot of the novel was mainly focused on solving a mystery, with a few small subplots.

Portrait Collections (1994–1997)
 Portrait Collections: These are autobiographies of The Baby-Sitters Club members (Stacey, Claudia, Dawn, Mary Anne, Kristy, and Abby). Mallory and Jessi were not included because the autobiographies were an eighth grade project only.

The Baby-Sitters Club: Friends Forever (1999–2000)
 The Baby-Sitters Club: Friends Forever: These novels are an extension of the original series, which focused on the original four members (Kristy, Mary Anne, Claudia, and Stacey). They were set following the fire at Mary Anne's house, which drastically impacted the lives of The Baby-Sitters Club members, and concluded with a final Super Special detailing the girls' graduation from Stoneybrook Middle School.

The Baby-Sitters Club: Reissue and The Summer Before 
 It depicted the lives of Kristy, Mary Anne, Claudia, and Stacey the summer before the school year began.

Spin-offs

Baby-Sitters Little Sister
The Baby-Sitters Little Sister novels were a series of novels for younger readers. It centered on Karen Brewer, the seven-year-old stepsister of Kristy Thomas. One hundred and twenty-two Baby-Sitters Little Sister novels and six Baby-Sitters Little Sister Super Special novels were published. The series ran from 1988 to 2000.

The Kids in Ms. Colman's Class
The Kids in Ms. Colman's Class series was a spin-off of the Baby-Sitters Little Sister series and covered Karen Brewer's second grade classmates at Stoneybrook Academy, and their adventures in Ms. Colman's classroom. Twelve novels were published. The series ran from 1995 to 1998. The titles are Teacher's Pet, Author Day, Class Play, Second Grade Baby, The Snow War, Twin Trouble, Science Fair, Summer School, Halloween Parade, Holiday Time, Spelling Bee, and Baby Animal Zoo.

California Diaries
The California Diaries series centered on Dawn Schafer and her friends after her return to California, and targeted a slightly older audience, with a darker feel. Fifteen novels were published focusing on the characters Dawn, Ducky McCrae, Amalia Vargas, Maggie Blume, and Sunny Winslow. Examples of subjects dealt with are anorexia, sexual orientation, and racism, along with the characters' personal problems and family disputes.

Graphic novels
In 2006, Graphix, a division of Scholastic, released a graphic novel version of the first novel, Kristy's Great Idea. The novel is a contemporary yet faithful adaptation illustrated by Raina Telgemeier, an Eisner Awards-winning author and illustrator. The series continued with the release of The Truth About Stacey, Mary Anne Saves the Day, and concluded with Claudia and Mean Janine.

Since then, four more graphic novels for The Baby-Sitters Club were released; they were adapted and illustrated by Gale Galligan. Dawn and the Impossible Three was published in 2017, Kristy’s Big Day was published in 2018, Boy-Crazy Stacey was published in 2019. and Logan Likes Mary Anne was published in 2020.

Starting in 2021, six more graphic novels are set to be published, two per year. Cartoonists Gabriela Epstein and Chan Chau will alternate as adapters of four of the books. Illustrator/adaptors for the final two books will be announced at a later date." Claudia and the New Girl, illustrated by Gabriela Epstein, was published on February 2, 2021. Kristy and the Snobs, illustrated by Chan Chau, was released September 7, 2021, Good-bye Stacey, Good-bye, illustrated by Gabriela Epstein, was published on February 1, 2022.Jessi's Secret Language, illustrated by Chan Chau, was published on September 6, 2022, and Mary Anne's Bad Luck Mystery, illustrated by Cynthia Yuan Cheng, was published on December 27, 2022, Stacey's Mistake, illustrated by Ellen T. Crenshaw is scheduled to release on October 3rd, 2023.

On April 30, 2019, it was announced that there are plans for a series of Baby-Sitters Little Sister graphic novels illustrated by Katy Farina and colored by Braden Lamb. The first graphic novel, Karen's Witch, was released on December 26, 2019. This was followed by Karen's Roller Skates which was released on July 7, 2020, Karen's Worst Day which was released on December 29, 2020. Karen's Kittycat Club was released on July 20, 2021, Karen's School Picture was released on February 1, 2022, Karen's Birthday was released on January 3, 2023, Karen's Haircut is scheduled to for a release on July 4, 2023.

Braden Lamb is the colorist for both The Baby-Sitters Club graphic novels and the Baby-Sitters Little Sister graphic novels.

TV series
In 1990, The Baby-Sitters Club spawned a 13-episode TV series that aired on HBO and Nickelodeon, and was later released on video.

In February 2019 it was announced that Netflix ordered a new version of the TV series, released on July 3, 2020.
It was canceled on March 11 2022.

Film

A film based on The Baby-Sitters Club novels was released in 1995. It starred Schuyler Fisk, Rachael Leigh Cook, Larisa Oleynik, Bre Blair, Tricia Joe, Zelda Harris, and Stacy Linn Ramsower.

Soundtrack

The Baby-Sitters Club: Songs for My Best Friends was a soundtrack for the series that was released on October 13, 1992 on CD and cassette tape. It included nine tracks written specifically for the series and the theme song to the original 1990 TV series.

Track listing
Track listing adapted from AllMusic.

Software
In 1996 a computer game titled Baby-Sitters Club Friendship Kit was produced by Phillips Media. It had the main members of The Baby-Sitters Club represented in videos that played, which would introduce each feature. It took place in Claudia’s room.

References

External links
 Scholastic site

 
American children's novels
American novels adapted into television shows
Novel series
Novels set in Connecticut
Scholastic franchises
Series of children's books
Vegetarianism in fiction